"Dear John" is a single released by the British rock band Status Quo in 1982. It was included on the album 1+9+8+2.
The song has an oddity: despite its success, it wasn't included on Quo compilations that mixed popular album tracks and hit singles (Accept No Substitute! The Definitive Hits, XS All Areas - The Greatest Hits), but only on singles compilations such as Pictures - 40 Years of Hits and Whatever You Want - The Very Best of Status Quo.

Track listing 
 "Dear John" (Jackie McAuley/John Gustafson) (3.12)
 "I Want the World to Know" (Alan Lancaster/Keith Lamb) (3.21)

Charts

Cover song
Kati Kovács: Hé, Zsolt (1982)

References 

Status Quo (band) songs
1982 singles
1982 songs
Vertigo Records singles